Elie Samaha (Arabic: إيلي سماحة) is a film producer in Los Angeles, with production credits beginning with The Immortals in 1995. He has produced over 83 works, primarily films along with some video games. He produced The Boondock Saints (1999), Battlefield Earth (2000), Driven (2001), 3,000 Miles to Graceland (2001), Heist (2001), The Pledge (2001), Spartan (2004), among many others.

Samaha built his reputation in Hollywood first as the owner of Celebrity Cleaners and then with his nightclub on Sunset Strip, the Roxbury. Parlaying the Hollywood friendships he formed through his clubs, Samaha was given a distribution deal with Warner Bros. Pictures in 1999.

Career
Samaha was a co-owner/founder of the dry cleaner chain Celebrity Cleaners and co-owner of the Roxbury nightclub in Los Angeles.

Between 1998 and 2004, Samaha produced films under the Franchise Pictures studio title, which included films such as The Boondock Saints , Mercy, Battlefield Earth, The Whole Nine Yards, Get Carter, Angel Eyes and Driven.

Samaha specialized in rescuing stars' pet projects. Franchise Pictures sought out stars whose projects were stalled at the major studios, bringing them aboard at reduced salaries. Samaha's approach was to produce star vehicles more cheaply than the larger studios. His unorthodox deals raised eyebrows and the entertainment industry magazine Variety commented that they were "often so complex and variable as to leave outsiders scratching their heads". As Samaha put it during an interview about Battlefield Earth, "I said, 'If John [Travolta] wants to make this movie, what does he want to get paid?' ... Because I do not pay anybody what they make. That is not my business plan."

He is currently the President of Take 3 Productions, which produced Breaking Brooklyn (2016), a dance film starring Louis Gossett Jr., Nathan Kress and Colin Critchley.

In 2000, Samaha was sued by Intertainment Pictures, his business partners on a number of films. Intertainment won a $70 million judgment against Samaha for fraudulently overcharging them for production costs on the films.

Films
He was a producer in all films unless otherwise noted.

Film

As an actor

As writer

Music department

Thanks

Television

See also

References

External links 
 

American film producers
Lebanese emigrants to the United States
Living people
People from Greater Los Angeles
People from Zahle
Year of birth missing (living people)